Kent Richardson (born April 21, 1987) is an American football cornerback who is a free agent. He played college football at West Virginia.

Professional career

Philadelphia Soul
In 2011, Richardson signed to play for the Philadelphia Soul of the Arena Football League. In 2012, he led the league in interceptions with 14, and was named the Defensive Back of the Year, as well as earning First-team All-Arena.

Cleveland Browns
After re-signing with the Soul for 2013, he was placed on other league exempt list due to his signing of a futures contract with the Cleveland Browns.

Jacksonville Sharks
After his release from the Browns, the Soul traded Richardson to the Jacksonville Sharks for Jeff Hughley.

Return to Soul
On February 27, 2014, Richardson was traded back to the Soul for Hughley once again.

Toronto Argonauts
On April 15, 2014, Richardson signed with the Toronto Argonauts of the Canadian Football League. He was released in June and re-joined the Soul.

Orlando Predators
On November 16, 2015, Richardson was assigned to the Orlando Predators.

Dalian Dragon Kings
Richardson was selected by the Dalian Dragon Kings of the China Arena Football League (CAFL) in the thirteenth round of the 2016 CAFL Draft. He earned All-Pro North Division All-Star honors in 2016.

Cleveland Gladiators
On January 31, 2017, Richardson was assigned to the Cleveland Gladiators.

Third stint with the Soul
On June 15, 2017, Richardson was assigned to the Soul. On August 26, 2017, the Soul beat the Tampa Bay Storm in ArenaBowl XXX by a score of 44–40.

Baltimore Brigade
On April 3, 2018, Richardson was assigned to the Baltimore Brigade. On April 6, 2018, he was placed on recallable reassignment.

Washington Valor
On April 11, 2018, he was assigned to the Washington Valor. On April 16, 2018, he was placed on reassignment.

References

External links

Toronto Argonauts bio
Cleveland Browns bio
Philadelphia Soul bio
West Virginia Mountaineers bio

1987 births
Living people
American football cornerbacks
American football safeties
West Virginia Mountaineers football players
Philadelphia Soul players
Cleveland Browns players
Jacksonville Sharks players
Orlando Predators players
Dalian Dragon Kings players
Cleveland Gladiators players
Baltimore Brigade players
Washington Valor players